"Bickenhead" is a song by American rapper Cardi B from her debut studio album Invasion of Privacy (2018). It was written by Cardi B and Jordan Thorpe, and produced by Ayo, Keyz and Nes. It samples Project Pat's song "Chickenhead", written by Juicy J, DJ Paul and Todd Shaw, which itself samples DJ Jimi's "Bitches (Reply)", written by Derrick Ordogne and Dion Norman; therefore they are all credited among the composers. It debuted at number 43 on the US Billboard Hot 100 the week following the album's release.

Background and production
An explicit song that expresses sexual liberation, "Bickenhead" builds on Cardi B's affinities with Southern rap, while serving as a response to Project Pat's "Chickenhead." Chickenhead is a derogatory term popularized in 1990s hip hop music that refers to a woman that performs oral sex indiscriminately. Changing the message, in the lyrics of "Bickenhead", reviewers noted Cardi B "takes ownership of her sexuality".

Dion Norman, who co-wrote the sampled song "Bitches (Reply)", stated about "Bickenhead":

Critical reception
In Complex, Kiana Fitzgerald said, "the beat itself is faithful to the first, with slight variations that make it sound like 2018 while still invoking the feel of the early '00s. It sounds like the song Cardi's been waiting her whole career to make, and she swan dived right into the depths of pearl-clutching crassness that we've come to love her for. (Half the song is dedicated to advice about pussy popping.) Above all else, 'Bickenhead' is a reminder to women everywhere that there's nothing wrong with alternating being a bird with being about your paper...". Writing for AllMusic, Neil Z. Yeung felt Cardi B gets "filthy" on the "explicit" track, that "it could make Lil' Kim or Foxy Brown blush."

Live performances
Cardi B performed "Bickenhead" and "She Bad" at the 36th AVN Awards on January 26, 2019.

Charts

Certifications

References

External links

2018 songs
Cardi B songs
Songs written by Cardi B
Songs with feminist themes
Songs written by DJ Paul
Songs written by Pardison Fontaine
Songs written by Too Short
Songs written by Keyz (producer)
Songs written by Ayo the Producer
Songs written by Juicy J